Oculus Medium is a digital sculpting software that works with virtual reality headsets and 6DoF motion controllers. It is used to create and paint digital sculptures. Medium works only on Oculus Rift. It was released on December 5, 2016, following with a major update in 2018 introducing new features and a revamped UI. On December 9, 2019, Oculus Medium was acquired by Adobe and re-named to "Medium by Adobe".

See also 

 ZBrush
Gravity Sketch
Tilt Brush
 Mudbox

References 

Graphics software
2016 software
Oculus Rift
Windows software